Nepal's telecommunication network has increased over the years significantly, with the number of telephone users (both fixed and mobile phone) reaching 40,789,198 subscribers as of 14 May 2019.

Nepal Telecommunications Authority (NTA) is the regulatory body of telecommunications in the country. According to the latest figures, eight companies have been licensed to operate voice-based telephony services, out of which five are heavily invested by foreign companies. The investment market of telecom is a subject of interest for many foreign companies and NTA itself as it has to prepare the regulations on hand.

According to the latest Management Information system (MIS) report of the Nepal Telecommunications Authority (NTA), 97.65 percent of 26.49 million people in the country have access to telephone service. The report includes data of up to mid-December 2014. Telephone penetration increased by 12.88 percentage points in one year. It stood at 84.77 percent in mid-December 2013.

History

The beginning

In Nepal, operating any form of telecommunication service dates back to 1970. However, telecom service was formally provided mainly after the establishment of MOHAN AKASHWANI in B.S. 2005. Later as per the plan formulated in the First National Five-year plan (2012-2017 BS), Telecommunication Department was established in B.S. 2016. In order to modernize the telecommunications services and expand the services, during the third five-year plan (2023-2028), Telecommunication Department was converted into Telecommunications Development Board in B.S. 2026.

After enacting the Communications Corporation Act 2028, it was formally established as a fully owned Government Corporation called Nepal Telecommunications Corporation in B.S. 2032 to provide telecommunications services to Nepalese People. After serving the nation for 29 years with great pride and a sense of accomplishment, Nepal Telecommunication Corporation was transformed into Nepal Doorsanchar Company Limited (NDCL) from Baisakh 1, 2061. NDCL is a company registered under the Companies Act 2053 with an 85% government share. However, the company is known to the general public by Nepal Telecom (NT) as a registered trademark.

Further developments and milestones

Some milestones:

 2017 Cellular 4G LTE starts in Nepal 
 2011 Launching of GSM 3G Data Only Service
 2011 Launching of EasyPhone SIP PPP Service
 2010 Launching of EasyPhone SIP EasyCall Service
 2010 Soft Launch of EasyPhone IP Call Service
 2010 EVDO Service started
 2009 Postpaid CDMA Mobile Service started
 2009 SMS Service from GSM to CDMA mobile started
 2009 IVR 1606 Service extended outside Kathmandu Valley
 2009 IVR 198 Service extended outside KTM valley
 2008 PSTN VMS - Notice Board Service Launched
 2008 IVR 198 service extended for ADSL Fault Complaint Registration
 2008 IVR Service 1607 started for GSM and CDMA PUK Enquiry
 2008 Broadband ADSL Service launched
 2007 GPRS, 3G and CRBT Services introduced in GSM Mobile
 2007 VOIP Call Complaint Registration started via 188 IVR Service
 2007 PSTN Bill Enquiry Service started via 1606 IVR Service
 2007 Expansion of Internet Bandwidth via Optical link between Nepal & India
 2007 National Roaming for CDMA Mobile (Sky Phone) started
 2006 CDMA Limited Servies in Kathmandu Valley
 2006 MCC (198) Complaint Registration via IVR in Kathmandu Valley
 2006 Home Country Direct Service - NepalDirect (IN)
 2006 PSTN Credit Limit Service - PCL (IN)
 2005 Outsourcing of Enquiry Service (197)
 2005 Access Network Services
 2005 Soft launch of CDMA
 2004 Pre-paid Calling Card Service (IN Services)
 2004 NEPAL TELECOM (Transformation from Corporation to Nepal Doorsanchar Company Limited)2003 GSM Prepaid Service
 2002 East-West Highway Optical Fiber Project
 2001 Launching of Payphone Service
 2000 Launching of Internet Service
 2000 Implementation of SDH Microwave Radio
 1999 Launching of GSM Mobile service
 1998 Direct Link with Bangladesh
 1997 Digital Link with D.O.T. India through Optical Fiber in Birgunj - Raxual 
 1996 Introduction of VSAT services
 1996 Independent Int. Gateway Exchange established
 1996 Automation of the entire Telephone Network
 1996 Conversion of all Transmission link to Digital transmission link
 1995 Installation of Optical Fiber Network
 1987 Commencement of STD service
 1984 Reliable Rural Telecom Service (JICA)
 1984 Commencement of STD service
 1983 Establishment of digital Telephone Exchange
 1982 Establishment of SPC telex exchange
 1982 Establishment of Standard "B" Type Earth Station for international circuits
 1974 Microwave transmission links establishment for internal trunk
 1971 Introduction of Telex Services
 1965 First Automatic exchange in Nepal (1000 lines in Kathmandu)
 1964 Beginning of International Telecommunications Service using HF Radio to India and Pakistan
 1962 First Public Telephone Exchange in Kathmandu (300 lines CB)
 1955 Distribution of telephone line to the general public
 1951 Installation of Open Wire Trunk line from Kathmandu to Palpa
 1950 Establishment of CB telephone exchange (100 lines) in Kathmandu
 1950 Introduction to High-frequency Radio System (AM)
 1950 Establishment of Telegram Service
 1936 Installation of Open Wire Trunk line from Kathmandu to Dhankuta
 1935 Installation of 25 lines automatic exchange in Royal Palace
 1914 Establishment of Open wire Trunk Link from Kathmandu to Raxaul (India)
 1913 Establishment of first telephone lines in Kathmandu

The first telephone exchange was established in Kathmandu in 1960. From 1960 to 2004, the state-owned Nepal Telecommunications Corporation (NTC), also known as Nepal Telecom, or Nepal Doorsanchar Company Limited (NDCL), had been the monopoly telecom carrier. Now, other competing telecom service providers are United Telecom (UTL) and Ncell.

Telephony

The country code for Nepal is 00977. As of May 2013, there are 644,347 wirline customers.

Telephone system:
 Good telephone and telegraph service; fair radio telephone communication service and mobile cellular telephone network
 Domestic: Microwave + Optical Fiber
 International Radio telephone Communications; microwave landline to India; satellite earth station - 2 Intelsat (Indian Ocean)

Mobile telephony 

As of 2019, there are four operational three major telecom operators in Nepal: 
 Nepal Telecom formerly known as Nepal Telecommunications Corporation (NTC)
 Ncell
 SmartCell

CG Telecom was set to launch its services in 2019.

Mobile Subscribers: 18,137,771 (May 2013)

5G connectivity
In 2019, Nepal Telecom has announced its intention to launch 5G services in the next few years after the deployment of 4G nationwide.

Internet

As of May 2013, there are 127 ISPs and 6.7 million internet users in Nepal.

Net neutrality

Television broadcasting

Television broadcast stations:  19 (37 registered) (2012)

Televisions: 130,000 (1997)

Radio

Radio broadcast stations: AM 6, FM 20, shortwave 1 (January 2000)Radios:' 20,00,000 (2006)

See also
 Nepal Telecommunications Authority
 List of Telecom Companies in Nepal
 List of countries by smartphone penetration 
 List of countries by Internet connection speeds

References

External links

 Nepal Telecommunications Authority